Terrible Certainty is the third studio album by German thrash metal band Kreator, released in 1987 through Noise Records. It was released on cd, cassette, black vinyl, and as a limited edition red vinyl. The remastered version of 2000 contains the tracks of the 1988 Out of the Dark... Into the Light EP as bonus tracks. Another remastered version in 2 CDs was released on 9 June 2017, and included all the live tracks from the EP.

Track listing
All songs and lyrics by Kreator

Personnel
Kreator'''
 Mille Petrozza – vocals, guitar
 Jörg "Tritze" Trzebiatowski - guitar
 Rob Fioretti – bass
 Ventor – drums, co-lead vocals on "As the World Burns"

Production
 Roy Rowland – production
 Phil Lawvere – cover artworks

References

Kreator albums
1987 albums
Noise Records albums